Guan Yu, courtesy name Yunchang, was a Chinese military general serving under the warlord Liu Bei during the late Eastern Han dynasty of China. Along with Zhang Fei, he shared a brotherly relationship with Liu Bei and accompanied him on most of his early exploits. Guan Yu played a significant role in the events leading up to the end of the Han dynasty and the establishment of Liu Bei's state of Shu Han during the Three Kingdoms period. While he is remembered for his loyalty towards Liu Bei, he is also known for repaying Cao Cao's kindness by slaying Yan Liang, a general under Cao Cao's rival Yuan Shao, at the Battle of Boma. After Liu Bei gained control of Yi Province in 214, Guan Yu remained in Jing Province to govern and defend the area for about seven years. In 219, while he was away fighting Cao Cao's forces at the Battle of Fancheng, Liu Bei's ally Sun Quan broke the Sun–Liu alliance and sent his general Lü Meng to conquer Liu Bei's territories in Jing Province. By the time Guan Yu found out about the loss of Jing Province after his defeat at Fancheng, it was too late. He was subsequently captured in an ambush by Sun Quan's forces and executed.

Guan Yu's life was lionised and his achievements glorified to such an extent after his death that he was deified during the Sui dynasty. Through generations of storytelling, culminating in the 14th-century historical novel Romance of the Three Kingdoms, his deeds and moral qualities have been given immense emphasis, making Guan Yu one of East Asia's most popular paradigms of loyalty and righteousness. He is still worshipped by many Chinese people today. In religious devotion he is reverentially called the "Emperor Guan" (Guān Dì) or "Lord Guan" (Guān Gōng). He is a deity worshipped in Chinese folk religion, popular Confucianism, Taoism, and Chinese Buddhism, and small shrines to him are almost ubiquitous in traditional Chinese shops and restaurants.

Historical sources
The authoritative historical source on Guan Yu's life is the Records of the Three Kingdoms (Sanguozhi) written by Chen Shou in the third century. During the fifth century, Pei Songzhi annotated the Sanguozhi by incorporating information from other sources to Chen Shou's original work and adding his personal comments. Some alternative texts used in the annotations to Guan Yu's biography include: Shu Ji (Records of Shu), by Wang Yin; Wei Shu (Book of Wei), by Wang Chen, Xun Yi and Ruan Ji; Jiang Biao Zhuan, by Yu Pu; Fu Zi, by Fu Xuan; Dianlue, by Yu Huan; Wu Li (History of Wu), by Hu Chong; and Chronicles of Huayang, by Chang Qu.

Physical appearance

No explicit descriptions of Guan Yu's physical appearance exist in historical records. However, the Sanguozhi recorded that Zhuge Liang once referred to Guan Yu as having a "peerless beard".

Traditionally, Guan Yu is portrayed as a red-faced warrior with a long, lush beard. The idea of his red face may have been derived from a description of him in Chapter 1 of the 14th-century historical novel Romance of the Three Kingdoms, where the following passage appears:

Alternatively, the idea of his red face could have been borrowed from opera representation, where red faces represented loyalty and righteousness. In illustrations of Romance of the Three Kingdoms, Guan Yu is traditionally depicted wearing a green robe over his body armour.

Supposedly, Guan Yu's weapon was a guan dao named Green Dragon Crescent Blade, which resembled a podao, glaive, or naginata and was said to weigh 82 catties (about 49.2 kg or 108.4674 lbs).

Early life and career

Guan Yu was from Xie County, Hedong Commandery, which is present-day Yuncheng, Shanxi. His original courtesy name was Changsheng. He was very studious, and was interested in the ancient history book Zuo zhuan and could fluently recite lines from it.” He fled from his hometown for unknown reasons and went to Zhuo Commandery. When the Yellow Turban Rebellion broke out in the 180s, Guan Yu and Zhang Fei joined a volunteer militia formed by Liu Bei, and they assisted a colonel Zou Jing in suppressing the revolt. Guan Yu and Zhang Fei were known as stalwart and strong men; which made them talented fighters.

When Liu Bei was appointed as the Minister of Pingyuan, Guan Yu and Zhang Fei were appointed as Majors of Separate Command, each commanding detachments of soldiers under Liu Bei. Liu Bei cherished them as if they were his own brothers and the three of them were as close as brothers to the point of sharing the same room, sleeping on the same mat and eating from the same pot. Zhang Fei and Guan Yu protected Liu Bei whenever there were large crowds of people and also stood guard beside him when he sat down at meetings all day long. They followed him on his exploits and were always ready to face any danger and hardship. And for their military prowess were appraised as "enemy of ten-thousand".” Guan Yu was noted for his kindness towards his soldiers and fealty to Liu Bei akin to family, but had no respect for the gentry and treated them without courtesy.

Short service under Cao Cao

Background
Liu Bei and his men followed Cao Cao back to the imperial capital Xu after their victory over Lü Bu at the Battle of Xiapi in 198. About a year later, Liu Bei and his followers escaped from Xu under the pretext of helping Cao Cao lead an army to attack Yuan Shu. Liu Bei went to Xu Province, killed the provincial inspector Che Zhou, and seized control of the province. He moved to Xiaopei and left Guan Yu in charge of the provincial capital Xiapi.

In 200, Cao Cao led his forces to attack Liu Bei, defeated him and retook Xu Province. Liu Bei fled to northern China and found refuge under Cao Cao's rival Yuan Shao, while Guan Yu was captured by Cao Cao's forces and brought back to Xu. Cao Cao treated Guan Yu respectfully and asked Emperor Xian to appoint Guan Yu as a Lieutenant-General.

Battle of Boma

Later that year, Yuan Shao sent his general Yan Liang to lead an army to attack Cao Cao's garrison at Boma (near present-day Hua County, Henan), which was defended by Liu Yan. Cao Cao sent Zhang Liao and Guan Yu to lead the vanguard to engage the enemy. In the midst of battle, Guan Yu recognised Yan Liang's parasol so he charged towards Yan Liang, decapitated him and returned with his head. Yan Liang's men could not stop him. With Yan Liang's death, the siege on Boma was lifted. On Cao Cao's recommendation, Emperor Xian awarded Guan Yu the peerage of "Marquis of Hanshou Village".

Leaving Cao Cao
Although Cao Cao admired Guan Yu's character, he also sensed that Guan Yu had no intention of serving under him for long. He told Zhang Liao, "Why don't you make use of your friendship with Guan Yu to find out what he wants?" When Zhang Liao asked him, Guan Yu replied, "I am aware that Lord Cao treats me very generously. However, I have also received many favours from General Liu and I have sworn to follow him until I die. I cannot break my oath. I will leave eventually, so maybe you can help me convey my message to Lord Cao." Zhang Liao did so, and Cao Cao was even more impressed with Guan Yu. The Fu Zi gave a slightly different account of this incident. It recorded that Zhang Liao faced a dilemma of whether or not to convey Guan Yu's message to Cao Cao: if he did, Cao Cao might execute Guan Yu; if he did not, he would be failing in his service to Cao Cao. He sighed, "Lord Cao is my superior and he is like a father to me, while Guan Yu is like a brother to me." He eventually decided to tell Cao Cao. Cao Cao said, "A subject who serves his lord but doesn't forget his origins is truly a man of righteousness. When do you think he will leave?" Zhang Liao replied, "Guan Yu has received favours from Your Excellency. He will most probably leave after he has repaid your kindness."

After Guan Yu slew Yan Liang and lifted the siege on Baima, Cao Cao knew that he would leave soon so he gave Guan Yu greater rewards. Guan Yu sealed up all the gifts he received from Cao Cao, wrote a farewell letter, and headed towards Yuan Shao's territory to find Liu Bei. Cao Cao's subordinates wanted to pursue Guan Yu, but Cao Cao stopped them and said, "He's just doing his duty to his lord. There's no need to pursue him."

Pei Songzhi commented on this as follows: "Cao Cao admired Guan Yu's character even though he knew that Guan Yu would not remain under him. He did not send his men to pursue Guan Yu when Guan Yu left, so as to allow Guan Yu to fulfil his allegiance (to Liu Bei). If he was not as magnanimous as a great warlord should be, how would he allow this to happen? This was an example of Cao Cao's goodness."

Returning to Liu Bei

When Cao Cao and Yuan Shao clashed at the Battle of Guandu in 200, Yuan sent Liu Bei to contact Liu Pi, a Yellow Turban rebel chief in Runan, and assist Liu Pi in attacking the imperial capital Xu while Cao Cao was away at Guandu. Guan Yu reunited with Liu Bei around this time. Liu Bei and Liu Pi were defeated by Cao Cao's general Cao Ren, after which Liu Bei returned to Yuan Shao. Liu Bei secretly planned to leave Yuan Shao, so he pretended to persuade Yuan Shao to form an alliance with Liu Biao, the Governor of Jing Province. Yuan Shao sent Liu Bei to contact another rebel leader, Gong Du, in Runan, where they gathered a few thousand soldiers. Cao Cao turned back and attacked Runan after scoring a decisive victory over Yuan Shao at Guandu, and he defeated Liu Bei in Runan. Liu Bei fled south and found shelter under Liu Biao, who put him in charge of Xinye at the northern border of Jing Province. Guan Yu followed Liu Bei to Xinye.

Battle of Red Cliffs and aftermath

Liu Biao died in 208 and was succeeded by his younger son, Liu Cong, who surrendered Jing Province to Cao Cao when the latter started a campaign that year with the aim of wiping out opposing forces in southern China. Liu Bei evacuated Xinye together with his followers and they headed towards Xiakou, which was guarded by Liu Biao's elder son Liu Qi and independent of Cao Cao's control. Along the journey, Liu Bei divided his party into two groups – one led by Guan Yu which would sail along the river towards Jiangling; another led by Liu Bei which would travel on land. Cao Cao sent 5,000 elite cavalry to pursue Liu Bei's group and they caught up with them at Changban, where the Battle of Changban broke out. Liu Bei and his remaining followers managed to escape from Cao Cao's forces and reach Han Ford, where Guan Yu's group picked them up and they sailed to Xiakou together.

In 208, Liu Bei allied with Sun Quan and they defeated Cao Cao at the decisive Battle of Red Cliffs. Cao Cao retreated north after his defeat and left Cao Ren behind to defend Jing Province. During the Battle of Jiangling, Guan Yu was stationed at the northern routes to block Cao Ren's supply lines via infiltration. Li Tong engaged Guan Yu, attempting to support Cao Ren's forces, but died from illness during the campaign. Xu Huang and Man Chong also engaged with Guan Yu in Hanjin() in order support Cao Ren against Zhou Yu. Finally, Yue Jin, stationed in Xiangyang, defeated Guan Yu and Su Fei and drove them away. After seizing and pacifying the various commanderies in southern Jing Province, Liu Bei appointed Guan Yu as the Administrator of Xiangyang and General Who Defeats Bandits, and ordered him to station at the north of the Yangtze River.

Guarding Jing Province
Between 212 and 214, Liu Bei started a campaign to seize control of Yi Province from the provincial governor Liu Zhang. Most of Liu Bei's subordinates participated in the campaign, while Guan Yu remained behind to guard and oversee Liu Bei's territories in Jing Province.

Sun-Liu territorial dispute

During the mid 210s, a territorial dispute broke out between Liu Bei and Sun Quan in southern Jing Province. According to an earlier arrangement, Liu Bei "borrowed" southern Jing Province from Sun Quan to serve as a temporary base; he would have to return the territories to Sun Quan once he found another base. After Liu Bei seized control of Yi Province, Sun Quan asked him to return three commanderies but Liu Bei refused. Sun Quan then sent his general Lü Meng to lead his forces to seize the three commanderies. In response, Liu Bei ordered Guan Yu to lead troops to stop Lü Meng. Gan Ning, one of Lü Meng's subordinates, managed to deter Guan Yu from crossing the shallows near Yiyang. The shallows were thus named 'Guan Yu's Shallows'. Lu Su (the overall commander of Sun Quan's forces in Jing Province) later invited Guan Yu to attend a meeting to settle the territorial dispute. Around 215, after Cao Cao seized control of Hanzhong Commandery, Liu Bei saw that as a strategic threat to his position in Yi Province so he decided to make peace with Sun Quan and agreed to divide southern Jing Province between his and Sun Quan's domains along the Xiang River. Both sides then withdrew their forces.

Battle of Fancheng

In 219, Liu Bei emerged victorious in the Hanzhong Campaign against Cao Cao, after which he declared himself "King of Hanzhong". He appointed Guan Yu as General of the Vanguard and bestowed upon him a ceremonial axe. In the same year, Guan Yu led his forces to attack Cao Ren at Fancheng and besiege the fortress. Cao Cao sent Yu Jin to lead reinforcements to help Cao Ren. It was in autumn and there were heavy showers so the Han River overflowed. The flood destroyed Yu Jin's seven armies. Guan Yu had prepared his navy to advance during the flood, and Yu Jin surrendered to Guan Yu while his subordinate Pang De refused and was executed by Guan Yu. Various local officials such as Administrator of Nanxiang Fu Fang and Inspector Jing Province Hu Xiu defected to Guan Yu. Angered by Cao Cao's forced labor put upon them, rebel peasants and bandits in Liang(), Jia() and Luhun() also submitted to Guan Yu and received official seals to work as his raiders. Guan Yu's fame spread throughout China.

The Shu Ji recorded that before Guan Yu embarked on the Fancheng campaign, he dreamt about a boar biting his foot. He told his son Guan Ping, "I am growing weaker this year. I might not even return alive."

Belittling Sun Quan
With Liu Bei gaining Hanzhong as well as the northwest commanderies of Jing: Fangling, Shangyong and Xicheng; and now after Yu Jin's defeat, Cao Cao contemplated relocating the imperial capital from Xu further north into Hebei to avoid Guan Yu, but Sima Yi and Jiang Ji told him that Sun Quan would become restless when he heard of Guan Yu's victory. They suggested to Cao Cao to ally with Sun Quan and get him to help them hinder Guan Yu's advances; in return, Cao Cao would recognise the legitimacy of Sun Quan's claim over the territories in Jiangdong. In this way, the siege on Fancheng would automatically be lifted. Cao Cao heeded their suggestion. Previously, Sun Quan had sent a messenger to meet Guan Yu and propose a marriage between his son and Guan Yu's daughter. However, Guan Yu not only rejected the proposal, but also scolded and humiliated the messenger. Sun Quan was enraged.

Encounter with Xu Huang
Cao Cao later sent Xu Huang to lead another army to reinforce Cao Ren at Fancheng. Xu Huang broke through Guan Yu's encirclement and routed Guan Yu's forces on the battlefield, thus lifting the siege on Fancheng. Guan Yu withdrew his forces after seeing that he could not capture Fancheng. The Shu Ji recorded an incident about Xu Huang encountering Guan Yu on the battlefield. Xu Huang was previously a close friend of Guan Yu. They often chatted about other things apart from military affairs. When they met again at Fancheng, Xu Huang gave an order to his men: "Whoever takes Guan Yu's head will be rewarded with 1,000 jin of gold." A shocked Guan Yu asked Xu Huang, "Brother, what are you talking about?" Xu Huang replied, "This is an affair of the state."

Losing Jing Province

Although Guan Yu defeated and captured Yu Jin at Fancheng, his army found itself lacking food supplies, so he seized grain from one of Sun Quan's granaries at Xiang Pass. By then, Sun Quan had secretly agreed to an alliance with Cao Cao and sent Lü Meng and others to invade Jing Province while he followed behind with reinforcements. At Xunyang, Lü Meng ordered his troops to hide in vessels disguised as civilian and merchant ships and sail towards Jing Province. Along the way, Lü Meng infiltrated and disabled the watchtowers set up by Guan Yu along the river, so Guan Yu was totally unaware of the invasion.

When Guan Yu embarked on the Fancheng campaign, he left Mi Fang and Shi Ren behind to defend his key bases in Jing Province – Nan Commandery and Gong'an. Guan Yu had constantly treated them with contempt. During the campaign, after Mi Fang and Shi Ren sent insufficient supplies to Guan Yu's army at the frontline, an annoyed Guan Yu said, "I will deal with them when I return." Mi Fang and Shi Ren felt uneasy about this. When Sun Quan invaded Jing Province, Lü Meng showed understanding towards Mi Fang and successfully induced him into surrendering while Yu Fan also persuaded Shi Ren to give up resistance. With the exceptions of the northwest, Liu Bei's territories in Jing Province fell under Sun Quan's control after the surrenders of Mi Fang and Shi Ren.

Dubious account from the Dianlue
The Dianlue recorded: 

Pei Songzhi commented on the Dianlue account as follows:

Death

By the time Guan Yu retreated from Fancheng, Sun Quan's forces had occupied Jiangling and captured the families of Guan Yu's soldiers. Lü Meng ordered his troops to treat the civilians well and ensure that they were not harmed. Most of Guan Yu's soldiers lost their fighting spirit and deserted and went back to Jing Province to reunite with their families. Guan Yu knew that he had been isolated so he withdrew to Maicheng (in present-day Dangyang, Hubei) and headed west to Zhang District, where his remaining men deserted him and surrendered to the enemy. Sun Quan sent Zhu Ran and Pan Zhang to block Guan Yu's retreat route. Guan Yu, along with his son Guan Ping and subordinate Zhao Lei, were captured alive by Pan Zhang's deputy Ma Zhong in an ambush. Guan Yu and Guan Ping were later executed by Sun Quan's forces in Linju (in present-day Nanzhang County, Hubei).

Alternate account from the Shu Ji
The Shu Ji mentioned that Sun Quan initially wanted to keep Guan Yu alive in the hope of using Guan Yu to help him counter Liu Bei and Cao Cao. However, his followers advised him against doing so by saying, "A wolf shouldn't be kept as a pet as it'll bring harm to the keeper. Cao Cao made a mistake when he refused to kill Guan Yu and landed himself in deep trouble. He even had to consider relocating the imperial capital elsewhere. How can Guan Yu be allowed to live?" Sun Quan then ordered Guan Yu's execution.

Pei Songzhi disputed this account as follows:

Posthumous honours
Sun Quan sent Guan Yu's head to Cao Cao, who arranged a noble's funeral for Guan Yu and had his head properly buried with full honours. In October or November 260, Liu Shan granted Guan Yu the posthumous title "Marquis Zhuangmou". According to posthumous naming rules in the Yi Zhou Shu, "mou" was meant for a person who failed to live up to his reputation.

Anecdotes

Request to take Qin Yilu's wife

During the Battle of Xiapi in late 198, when the allied forces of Cao Cao and Liu Bei fought against Lü Bu, Guan Yu sought permission from Cao Cao to marry Qin Yilu's wife Lady Du after they won the battle. After Cao Cao agreed, Guan Yu still repeatedly reminded Cao Cao about his promise before the battle ended. After Lü Bu's defeat and death, Cao Cao was so curious about why Guan Yu wanted Lady Du so badly and he guessed that she must be very beautiful, so he had her brought to him. Cao Cao ultimately broke his promise as he took Lady Du as his concubine and adopted her son Qin Lang (whom she had with Qin Yilu).

Advice to Liu Bei
The Shu Ji recorded an incident as follows: 

Pei Songzhi commented on the Shu Ji account as follows:

Asking Zhuge Liang about Ma Chao
In 214, Ma Chao defected from Zhang Lu's side to Liu Bei's forces, and he assisted Liu Bei in pressuring Liu Zhang to surrender and yield Yi Province to Liu Bei. When Guan Yu received news that Ma Chao (whom he was unfamiliar with) had recently joined them, he wrote to Zhuge Liang in Yi Province and asked him who was comparable to Ma Chao. Zhuge Liang knew that Guan Yu was defending the border (so he should not displease Guan Yu). He replied: "Mengqi is proficient in both civil and military affairs. He is fierce and mighty, and a hero of his time. He is comparable to Qing Bu and Peng Yue. He can compete with Yide, but he is not as good as the peerless beard."

Guan Yu was very pleased when he received Zhuge Liang's reply and he welcomed Ma Chao.

Arm injury
Guan Yu was once injured in the left arm by a stray arrow which pierced through his arm. Although the wound healed, he still experienced pain in the bone whenever there was a heavy downpour. A physician told him, "The arrowhead had poison on it and the poison had seeped into the bone. The way to get rid of this problem is to cut open your arm and scrape away the poison in your bone." Guan Yu then stretched out his arm and asked the physician to heal him. He then invited his subordinates to dine with him while the surgery was being performed. Blood flowed from his arm into a container below. Throughout the operation, Guan Yu feasted, consumed alcohol and chatted with his men as though nothing had happened.

Family
Guan Yu had two known sons – Guan Ping and Guan Xing. Guan Xing inherited his father's title "Marquis of Hanshou Village" and served in the state of Shu during the Three Kingdoms period. Guan Yu also had a daughter. Sun Quan once proposed a marriage between his son and Guan Yu's daughter, but Guan Yu rejected the proposal. Her name was not recorded in history, but she was known as "Guan Yinping" or "Guan Feng" in folktales and Chinese opera, as well as in the Dynasty Warriors video game series (as Guan Yinping). Guan Yu allegedly had a third son, Guan Suo, who is not mentioned in historical texts and appears only in folklore, the Romance of the Three Kingdoms novel, and in Dynasty Warriors.

Guan Xing's son, Guan Tong, married a princess (one of Liu Shan's daughters) and served as a General of the Household among the imperial guards. Guan Tong had no son when he died, so he was succeeded by his younger half-brother Guan Yi.

According to the Shu Ji, after the fall of Shu in 263, Pang Hui (Pang De's son) massacred Guan Yu's family and descendants to avenge his father, who was executed by Guan Yu after the Battle of Fancheng in 219.

In 1719, the Kangxi Emperor of the Qing dynasty awarded the hereditary title "Wujing Boshi" ("Professor of the Five Classics") to Guan Yu's descendants living in Luoyang. The bearer of the title is entitled to an honorary position in the Hanlin Academy.

Appraisal

Chen Shou, who wrote Guan Yu's biography in the Sanguozhi, commented on the latter as such: "Guan Yu and Zhang Fei were praised as mighty warriors capable of fighting ten thousand of enemies (萬人敵). They were like tigers among (Liu Bei's) subjects. Guan Yu and Zhang Fei both had the style of a guoshi. Guan Yu repaid Cao Cao's kindness while Zhang Fei released Yan Yan out of righteousness. However, Guan Yu was unrelenting and conceited while Zhang Fei was brutal and heartless. These shortcomings resulted in their downfalls. This was not something uncommon."

Both Guan Yu and Zhang Fei had a prominent reputation during their lifetimes as great warriors. To the point that eminent officials from other kingdoms such as Cheng Yu, Guo Jia and Zhou Yu directly referred to them as warriors who are a match for ten thousand men (萬人敵) and generals with the might of bears and tigers. Such was the extent of their fames. Another lesser known official working for Cao Cao's state, Fu Gan (傅幹) qualified Zhang Fei and Guan Yu as heroes of their time possessing both braveness and righteousness; and also repeat the assessment that they are warriors who are a match for ten thousand men (萬人敵).

The appraisal used by people of their lifetimes to describe Guan Yu and Zhang Fei as warriors who are a match for ten thousand men (萬人敵) would transcend the Three Kingdoms era and later be used in Chinese culture as an idiom to characterize someone as possessing extraordinary strength.

The Australian sinologist Rafe de Crespigny commented: "There are anecdotes describing Zhang Fei as a man of literary tastes who composed verse in the midst of battle, but he is more generally known as arrogant, impetuous and brutal. While Guan Yu was said to be harsh towards men of the gentry but treated his soldiers well, Zhang Fei was courteous towards his betters but cruel to his rank and file. The two men were nonetheless regarded as the finest fighting men of their lifetime."

In Romance of the Three Kingdoms

The 14th-century historical novel Romance of the Three Kingdoms glorifies Guan Yu by portraying him as a righteous and loyal warrior. Guan Yu is one of the most altered and aggrandised characters in the novel, which accounts for his popular image in Chinese society.

See the following for some fictitious stories in Romance of the Three Kingdoms involving Guan Yu:

 Oath of the Peach Garden
 Battle of Hulao Pass
 List of fictitious stories in Romance of the Three Kingdoms#Guan Yu's three conditions
 List of fictitious stories in Romance of the Three Kingdoms#Guan Yu slays Yan Liang and Wen Chou
 List of fictitious stories in Romance of the Three Kingdoms#Guan Yu crosses five passes and slays six generals
 List of fictitious stories in Romance of the Three Kingdoms#Guan Yu slays Cai Yang at Gucheng
 List of fictitious stories in Romance of the Three Kingdoms#Guan Yu releases Cao Cao at Huarong Trail
 Sun–Liu territorial dispute#In Romance of the Three Kingdoms
 List of fictitious stories in Romance of the Three Kingdoms#Hua Tuo heals Guan Yu's arm
 Lü Meng#In Romance of the Three Kingdoms
 List of fictitious stories in Romance of the Three Kingdoms#Events after Guan Yu's death

Worship of Guan Yu

Guan Yu was deified as early as the Sui dynasty (581–618), and is still worshipped today as a bodhisattva in Buddhist tradition and as a guardian deity in Chinese folk religion and Taoism. He is also held in high esteem in Confucianism and in new religious movements such as Yiguandao.

In Chinese religion

In Chinese folk religion, Guan Yu is widely referred to as "Emperor Guan" (dì implies deified status) and "Lord Guan", while his Taoist title is "Holy Emperor Lord Guan". Martial temples and shrines dedicated exclusively to Guan Yu can be found across mainland China, Hong Kong, Macau, Taiwan, and other places with Chinese influence such as Vietnam, South Korea and Japan. Some of these temples, such as the Guandi Temple in Xiezhou, Shanxi, were built exactly in the layout of an imperial residence, befitting his status as a "ruler". Other examples of Guan Yu temples in China include the Guandi Temple of Jinan and the Guanlin Temple of Luoyang.

Historical veneration 
The apotheosis of Guan Yu occurred in stages, as he was given ever higher posthumous titles. Liu Shan, the second emperor of Shu, gave Guan Yu the posthumous title of "Marquis Zhuangmou" four decades after his death. During the Song dynasty, Emperor Huizong bestowed upon Guan Yu the title "Duke Zhonghui", and later the title of a prince. In 1187, Emperor Xiaozong honoured Guan Yu as "Prince Zhuangmou Yiyong Wu'an Yingji". During the Yuan dynasty, Emperor Wenzong changed Guan Yu's title to "Prince of Xianling Yiyong Wu'an Yingji".

In 1614, the Wanli Emperor bestowed on Guan Yu the title "Holy Emperor Guan, the Great God Who Subdues Demons in the Three Worlds and Whose Awe Spreads Far and Moves Heaven". During the Qing dynasty, the Shunzhi Emperor gave Guan Yu the title of "Guan, the Loyal and Righteous God of War, the Holy Great Emperor" in 1644. This title was expanded to "Guan the Holy Great Emperor; God of War Manifesting Benevolence, Bravery and Prestige; Protector of the Country and Defender of the People; Proud and Honest Supporter of Peace and Reconciliation; Promoter of Morality, Loyalty and Righteousness", a total of 24 Chinese characters, by the mid-19th century. It is often shortened to "Saint of War", which is of the same rank as Confucius, who is honoured the "Saint of Culture". The Qing dynasty promoted the worship of Guan Yu among the Mongol tribes, making him one of their most revered religious figures, second only to their lamas.

Throughout history, Guan Yu has also been credited with many military successes. In the 14th century, his spirit was said to have aided Zhu Yuanzhang, the founder of the Ming dynasty, at the Battle of Lake Poyang. In 1402, when Zhu Di launched a coup d'état and successfully deposed his nephew, the Jianwen Emperor, Zhu Di claimed that he was blessed by the spirit of Guan Yu. During the last decade of the 16th century, Guan Yu was also credited with the repulse of Japanese invasion of Korea by Toyotomi Hideyoshi. The Manchu imperial clan of the Qing dynasty was also associated with Guan Yu's martial qualities. During the 20th century, Guan Yu was worshipped by the warlord Yuan Shikai, president and later a short-lived emperor of China.

Guan Yu's messages were received by mediums through spirit writing, later called Fuji (planchette writing), since the late 17th century. “By the mid-Qianlong period (1736–96) the number of ‘sacred edicts’ issued by Guandi ordering people to do good and help those in need became increasingly frequent.” In the 19th century, Guandi’s messages received through spirit writing assumed a millennialist character. Dates were announced for the end of the world, followed by messages indicating that Guandi had “prevented the apocalypse” and was indeed “the savior of endtimes.” In 1866, the Ten Completions Society (Shiquanhui 十全會) was established to propagate the messages of Guandi and promote the charitable work his spirit had ordered to perform. The tradition of Guandi spirit writing continued in Chinese folk Religion well into the 20th century.

Contemporary veneration 

Today, Guan Yu is still widely worshipped by the Chinese; he may be worshipped in Martial temples and Wen Wu temples, and small shrines devoted to him are also found in homes, businesses and fraternal organisations. In Hong Kong, a shrine to Guan Yu can be found in every police station. Though by no means mandatory, Chinese police officers worship and pay respect to him. Although seemingly ironic, members of the triads and Heaven and Earth Society worship Guan Yu as well. Statues used by triads tend to hold the halberd in the left hand, and statues in police stations tend to hold the halberd in the right hand. This signifies which side Guan Yu is worshipped, by the righteous people or vice versa. The appearance of Guan Yu's face for the triads is usually more stern and threatening than the usual statue. In Hong Kong, Guan Yu is often referred to as "Yi Gor" (Cantonese for "second elder brother") for he was second to Liu Bei in their fictional sworn brotherhood. Guan Yu is also worshipped by Chinese businessmen in Shanxi, Hong Kong, Macau and Southeast Asia as an alternative wealth god, since he is perceived to bless the upright and protect them from the wicked. Another reason is related to the release of Cao Cao during the Huarong Trail incident, in which he let Cao and his men pass through safely. For that, he was perceived to be able to extend the lifespan of people in need. Among Chinese Filipinos in the Philippines, Guan Yu is also sometimes known as "Santo Santiago" (St. James) or in Hokkien as "Te Ya Kong" (Hokkien ) or "Kuan Kong" (Hokkien ).

Among the Cantonese people who emigrated to California during the mid-19th century, the worship of Guan Yu was an important element. Statues and tapestry images of the god can be found in a number of historical California joss houses (a local term for Chinese folk religion temples), where his name may be given with various Anglicised spellings, including: Kwan Dai, Kwan Tai or Kuan Ti for Guandi (Emperor Guan); Kuan Kung for Guan Gong (Lord Guan), Wu Ti or Mo Dai for Wu Di (War Deity), Kuan Yu, Kwan Yu, or Quan Yu for Guan Yu. The Mendocino Joss House, a historical landmark also known as Mo Dai Miu (Wudimiao, i.e. the Temple of the Deity of War), or Temple of Kwan Tai, built in 1852, is a typical example of the small shrines erected to Guan Yu in the United States.

Guan Yu is also worshipped as a door god in Chinese and Taoist temples, with portraits of him being pasted on doors to ward off evil spirits, usually in pairings with Zhang Fei, Guan Ping, Guan Sheng or Zhou Cang.

Apart from general worship, Guan Yu is also commemorated in China with colossal statues such as the 1,320-tonne sculpture in Jingzhou City, Hubei Province, standing at 58 metres.

In Taoism

Guan Yu is revered as "Holy Ruler Deity Guan" and a leading subduer of demons in Taoism. Taoist worship of Guan Yu began during the Song dynasty. Legend has it that during the second decade of the 12th century, the saltwater lake in Xiezhou gradually ceased to yield salt. Emperor Huizong then summoned Zhang Jixian, a 30th-generation descendant of Zhang Daoling, to investigate the cause. The emperor was told that the disruption was the work of Chi You, a deity of war. Zhang Jixian then recruited the help of Guan Yu, who battled Chi You over the lake and triumphed, whereupon the lake resumed salt production. Emperor Huizong then bestowed upon Guan Yu the title "Immortal of Chongning", formally introducing the latter as a deity into Taoism.

In the early Ming dynasty, the 42nd Celestial Master, Zhang Zhengchang, recorded the incident in his book Lineage of the Han Celestial Masters, the first Taoist classic to affirm the legend. Today, Taoist practices are predominant in Guan Yu worship. Many temples dedicated to Guan Yu, including the Emperor Guan Temple in Xiezhou County, show heavy Taoist influence. Every year, on the 24th day of the sixth month on the lunar calendar (Guan Yu's birthday in legend), a street parade in Guan Yu's honour would also be held.

In Buddhism

In Chinese Buddhism, Guan Yu is revered by most Chinese Mahayana Buddhists as Sangharama Bodhisattva a heavenly protector of the Buddhist dharma. Sangharama in Sanskrit means 'community garden' (sangha, community + arama, garden) and thus 'monastery'. The term Sangharama also refer to the dharmapala class of devas and spirits assigned to guard the Buddhist monastery, the dharma, and the faith itself. Over time and as an act of syncreticism, Guan Yu was seen as the representative guardian of the temple and the garden in which it stands. His statue traditionally is situated in the far left of the main altar, opposite his counterpart Skanda.

According to Buddhist legends, in 592, Guan Yu manifested himself one night before the Chan master Zhiyi, the founder of the Tiantai school of Buddhism, along with a retinue of spiritual beings. Zhiyi was then in deep meditation on Jade Spring Hill when he was distracted by Guan Yu's presence. Guan Yu then requested the master to teach him about the dharma. After receiving Buddhist teachings from the master, Guan Yu took refuge in the triple gems and also requested the Five Precepts. Henceforth, it is said that Guan Yu made a vow to become a guardian of temples and the dharma. Legends also claim that Guan Yu assisted Zhiyi in the construction of the Yuquan Temple, which still stands today.

Notable Guandi temples worldwide (outside mainland China)
 Dongmyo (東關王廟) in Seoul, South Korea (built in 1601)
 Miếu Quan Công in Hoi An, Quang Nam, Vietnam (built in 1653)
 State Temple of the Martial God (祀典武廟) in Tainan, Taiwan (built in 1663)
 Old Chinese Temple of Seven Prefectures (七府古廟) in Bien Hoa, Vietnam (built in 1684)
 Kuan Tai Temple (Sam Kai Vui Kun) in Macau (built in 1750)
 Gong Wu Shrine, in Bangkok, Thailand
  Kwan Sing Bio Temple (Klenteng Kwan Sing Bio)  in Tuban, Indonesia (built in 1773)
 Hội quán Nghĩa An in District 5, Ho Chi Minh City, Vietnam (built in 1819)
 Chùa Ông Quan Đế Miếu in Bac Lieu, Vietnam (built in 1835)
 Temple of Kwan Tai in California, United States (built in 1854)
 Guandi Temple in Kuala Lumpur, Malaysia (built in 1887)
 Sam Sing Kung Temple in Sabah, Malaysia (built in 1887)
 Sze Yup Kwan Ti Temple in Glebe, New South Wales, Australia (built in 1898)
 Yiu Ming Temple in Alexandria, New South Wales, Australia (built in 1907)
 Yuqing Temple in Miaoli, Taiwan (built in 1906)
 Chinese Temple of Dili in East Timor (built in 1928)
 Xingtian Temple in Taipei, Taiwan (built in 1967)
 Kwan Kung Pavilion in Cheung Chau Island, Hong Kong (built in 1973)
 Setia Budi Temple at Jalan Irian Barat Medan, Indonesia (built in 1908)
 Santiago Chinese Temple in Santiago, Isabela, Philippines

In popular culture

Chinese opera

Guan Yu appears in Chinese operas such as Huarong Trail, Red Cliffs, and other excerpts from Romance of the Three Kingdoms. His costume is a green military opera uniform with armour covering his right arm and the knees of his pants. The actor's face is painted red with a few black lines, to represent honour and courage. He also wears a long three-section black beard made of yak hair and carries the Green Dragon Crescent Blade. Traditionally, after the show ends, the actor has to wash his face, burn joss paper, light incense, and pray to Chinese deities.

Film and television
Notable actors who have portrayed Guan Yu in film and television include: Lu Shuming in Romance of the Three Kingdoms (1994); Wang Yingquan in The Legend of Guan Gong (2004); Ti Lung in Three Kingdoms: Resurrection of the Dragon (2008); Ba Sen in Red Cliff (2008–2009); Yu Rongguang in Three Kingdoms (2010); Donnie Yen in The Lost Bladesman (2011); Au Sui-Wai in Three Kingdoms RPG (2012); Han Geng in Dynasty Warriors (2019).

Films which make references to Guan Yu include: Stephen Chow's comedy film From Beijing with Love (1994), which, in one scene, refers to the story of Hua Tuo performing surgery on Guan Yu's arm; Zhang Yimou's Riding Alone for Thousands of Miles (2005), in which the fictional story of Guan Yu slaying six generals and crossing five passes forms a major part of the narrative; the horror comedy film My Name Is Bruce (2007), where Guan Yu's vengeful spirit is accidentally set free by a group of teenagers and he begins to terrorise their town.

Games

Guan Yu appears as a playable character in many video games based on Romance of the Three Kingdoms which are produced by Koei, including: the strategy game series of the same title as the novel; the action game series Dynasty Warriors and Warriors Orochi. Other non-Koei titles in which he also appears include: Total War: Three Kingdoms;  Puzzle & Dragons; Sango Fighter; Destiny of an Emperor; and Atlantica Online. He is also referenced in Emperor: Rise of the Middle Kingdom, Titan Quest, and Koihime Musō.

Guan Yu is referenced in the Portal Three Kingdoms of the card game Magic: The Gathering on a playable card.

The hero Jiang Jun that appears in an add-on for the game For Honor, developed by Ubisoft Montreal, is heavily based on Guan Yu. He is introduced in the 2018 DLC Marching Fire Expansion, along with the other characters from the Chinese Wulin faction. The Jiang Jun wields Guan Yu's signature Guandao weapon and is portrayed as a wise older general.

Guan Yu is referenced in the 2020 game Hades by Supergiant Games. The final "aspect", or form, unlocked for the Eternal Spear weapon is the Aspect of Guan Yu, the Frost Fair Blade, which resembles an ornamented Guandao. The Eternal Spear is said to be the same spear wielded by Guan Yu in the future, taking this form.

Coinage
Guan Yu is a popular motif in collector coins series featuring Ancient warriors. The Polish Mint issued a 2oz silver coin featuring him in 2019, and another one in 2021.

 In modern politics 
During the course of price liberalization debates as part of China's reform and opening up, Deng Xiaoping invoked the fictitious story of Guan Yu crossing five passes and slaying six generals (as described in the novel Romance of the Three Kingdoms) as part of his rhetoric. "To the Chinese audience familiar with the famous tale of Lord Guan, there could have been no doubt of Deng's determination to push ahead with radical price reforms." As Deng explained in 1986 to a North Korean delegation:

See also
 Enzhugong
 Martial temple & Wen Wu temple
 Kwan Tai temples in Hong Kong
 Hip Tin temples in Hong Kong
 Holy Emperor Guan's True Scripture to Awaken the World Lists of people of the Three Kingdoms
 Statue of Guan Yu (Jingzhou)

Notes

References
 Citations from volume 36 of the Sanguozhi 

 Citations from elsewhere in the Sanguozhi 

 Citations from the Sanguozhi zhu 

 Other citations 

Bibliography

 (Author unknown) (4th century BC). Yi Zhou Shu.
 
 Chen, Shou (3rd century). Records of the Three Kingdoms (Sanguozhi).
 Chang Qu (4th century). Chronicles of Huayang (Huayang Guo Zhi).
 
 
 
 
 Luo, Guanzhong (14th century). Romance of the Three Kingdoms (Sanguo Yanyi).
 Pei, Songzhi (5th century). Annotations to Records of the Three Kingdoms (Sanguozhi zhu).
 
 
 Sima, Guang (1084). Zizhi Tongjian''.

External links

 
220 deaths
3rd-century executions
Chinese warriors
Deified Chinese people
Executed Han dynasty people
Executed people from Shanxi
Fortune gods
Generals under Cao Cao
Generals under Liu Bei
Han dynasty generals from Shanxi
Liu Biao and associates
People executed by the Han dynasty by decapitation
People from Yuncheng
Political office-holders in Hubei
Tutelary deities
War gods
Year of birth unknown
Chinese deities
Chinese gods
Deities in Taoism